Lanceimermis is a genus of nematodes belonging to the family Mermithidae.

Species:
 Lanceimermis austriaca (Micoletzky, 1914) 
 Lanceimermis baikalensis Rubzov, 1976

References

Mermithidae